Aussie Broadband (ABB) is an Australian operated telecommunications company that was formed in 2008 and is based in Morwell, Victoria, Australia.  

ABB also has offices in Dandenong South, Victoria, Darwin, Northern Territory, Sydney, New South Wales, Brisbane, Queensland, Perth, Western Australia, and remote staff scattered across Australia. It is one of the largest employers in the Latrobe Valley region.

The company was formed in 2008 after the amalgamation of Wideband Networks Pty Ltd and Westvic Broadband Pty Ltd.

Aussie Broadband is the fifth largest connector of new NBN connections in Australia.

History 
Aussie Broadband was the result of the amalgamation of Wideband Networks Pty Ltd and Westvic Broadband Pty Ltd, both of which had been trading since 2003. Wideband Networks Pty Ltd was formed by now Managing Director Phillip Britt and Chief Technical Officer (CTO) John Reisinger.

After the merger, Aussie Broadband focused on providing services to regional areas, such as Gippsland, Western Victoria, South Australia and the Northern Territory.

In 2010, Aussie Broadband sold its satellite customer base to SkyMesh, the largest sale of a satellite customer base in Australia.

Aussie Broadband started providing NBN services as of 2017, ceasing third party reseller agreements.

In October 2018, Fetch and Aussie Broadband announced a partnership.

In 2019, Aussie Broadband upgraded its national and international networks to provide capacity for 500,000 customers with direct peering in Los Angeles, San Jose, and Singapore, as well as buying capacity on multiple international fibre optic cables.

In September 2019 it was announced work had commenced to prepare the company for going public, and in September 2020 Managing Director Phil Britt formally announced the company would be launching an IPO and listing on the Australian Securities Exchange. The public offer was extended to customers of the company, and current employees were eligible to be gifted a small package of shares. The company began trading on the market at 11am on 16 October 2020 under the ticker ABB.

In March 2022, Aussie Broadband acquired Brisbane-based IT company Over the Wire for $344 million. Over the Wire provides voice networks, security services and cloud-based management systems for businesses.

Awards 
In 2019, Managing Director Phillip Britt was recognised by CommsDay for his contributions to the Australian telecommunications industry by being inducted into the Edison Awards Hall of Fame.

References

External links
 

Internet service providers of Australia
Telecommunications companies established in 2008